B. armata may refer to:

 Banksia armata, the prickly dryandra, a shrub species endemic to Western Australia
 Brahea armata, the Mexican blue palm or blue hesper palm, a palm species native to Baja California

See also
 Armata (disambiguation)